Comocladia dodonaea, with common names poison ash, and Christmas bush, is a species of tree in the cashew family, Anacardiaceae. It is native to Caribbean islands.

In the sap of the plant and on the surface of the leaves is an urushiol poison similar to that in poison ivy.

References

Anacardiaceae
Trees of the Amazon
Trees of Brazil